Nikola Tasić may refer to:
Nikola Tasić (footballer, born 1990), known as Nikola T. Tasić, Serbian association football midfielder who was transferred to Javorník Makov in 2016–2017

Nikola Tasić (footballer, born 1992), known as Nikola D. Tasić, Serbian professional footballer who plays as a midfielder for Serbian club Jagodina
Nikola Tasić (footballer, born 1994), known as Nikola Z. Tasić, Serbian association football goalkeeper